Suzanne Angelique Rogers ( Kolev) is a Canadian philanthropist and socialite who has been called "the Fairy Godmother of Canadian Fashion". She is married to Edward Rogers, chairman of Rogers Communications.

Early life and family 
Rogers was born in Elliot Lake in Northeastern Ontario. Her parents, Suzanna and Miklos, immigrated there from Budapest, Hungary prior to her birth. She later attended the University of Western Ontario.

Rogers has spoken about the dichotomy between her family's roots in communist Hungary and her current life married to the chair of Rogers Communications. In a 2015 exclusive interview, she said that remembering her grandmother's struggles helps her to stay grounded and have “a different perspective on life”.

Career 
Rogers is founder of one of Canada's best-known fundraiser series, Suzanne Rogers Presents, which has partnered with designers including Oscar de la Renta, Marchesa, Zac Posen, Diane von Fürstenberg and Victoria Beckham. She has also provided support to Toronto's Ryerson University, Faculty of Communication and Design. In October 2016, Ryerson University founded the Suzanne Rogers Fashion Institute (SRFI) after a $1 million donation from the Edward and Suzanne Rogers Foundation to Ryerson's Faculty of Communication and Design, in addition to the SRFI Fellowship program for the faculty's students.

SRFI has supported over a dozen third- and fourth-year fashion design students by eliminating financial barriers, providing mentorship and funding. SRFI Director Robert Ott has called the program “the entry ticket to international opportunities and success”. Rogers also established the "Suzanne Rogers Designer Grant for International Development". Past recipients include Greta Constantine and Sid Neigum. Rogers also funded the $25,000 Suzanne Rogers Award for Most Promising New Label at the Toronto Fashion Incubator's annual gala.

Beyond the fashion industry, Rogers has supported Covenant House including participating in its "sleep out" campaign to raise awareness for homelessness and by chairing of Covenant House's anti human-trafficking "Just Like a Girl You Know" campaign. She was also honorary chair of The Butterfly Ball, in support of the Boost Child & Youth Advocacy Centre which provides services to victims of child abuse and their families. In an interview by Dolce Magazine about her work with Suzanne, Boost's executive director Karyn Kennedy was resoundingly positive saying “she doesn't just write cheques — she really puts her heart and soul in it."  

In May 2021, Rogers posted an Instagram story with former U.S. President Donald Trump at his private club, Mar-a-Lago, in Palm Beach, Fla., captioned, "A Special Way to End the Night!" The post caused an immediate backlash from members of the Canadian fashion industry. Rogers later stated that, “I have always believed in equality, diversity, inclusiveness and respect for all”.

Media 
She was featured along with her daughter in the 2013 Flare’s Icons issue, showcasing the 50 most stylish Canadians of all time, as well as Hello! Canada's 2014 list of Canada's Best Dressed.

In 2019, designer Sid Neigum said referred to Rogers as "the Fairy Godmother of Canadian Fashion".

References 

Canadian philanthropists
Living people
Canadian women philanthropists
Canadian socialites
Year of birth missing (living people)